Amir Hamza is the nom de guerre of a veteran of the Afghan Jihad and one of the founders of the Islamic militant group Lashkar-e-Taiba. Described as "a fiery speaker and a prolific writer", he's also considered to be "the top LeT ideologue."

The United States Treasury classifies Lashkar-e-Taiba (LeT) as a terrorist group.  They have specifically listed Amir Hamza as a terrorist who they argue should be the target of International sanctions. LeT infiltrates fighters into the portion of the disputed Jammu and Kashmir territory that is occupied by India. Hamza is believed to sit on its Central Committee.  He is said to have negotiated for the release of other leaders, and to have led LeT's campaigns for charitable donations, and to have been the founding editor of LeT's official publication.

In 2002 Hamza published Qafila Da'wat aur Shahadat (Caravan of Proselytizing and Martydom).

Books
The head of LeT's publications division and the editor of many of its periodicals (like the monthly magazine Mujallah ad-Dawah), he's the author of the following books, among others:
Toor-e-Khan Se Koh-e-Qaaf Tak—Roos Ke Taaqub Mein (From Torkhum to the Caucasus—Hotly Pursuing Russia) 
Shahrah-e-Bahisht (The Road to Paradise) 
Afghanistan Ki Chuttiyo Par—Qafla Dawat o Jihad (On the Mountain Tops of Afghanistan—The Caravans of Call and Jihad).
Mainey Bible Se Pucha Qur’an Kyun Jaley ? (I Asked the Bible Why the Qurans were Set Alight)
Hindu Ka Hamdard (Hindu's Well Wisher)
Kashmiri Aurat Aur Amrika (Kashmiri Woman and America)
Khomeini Aur Kamal Ataturk Kay Iran Aur Turkey Mein Main Ney Kiya Dekha (What Did I See in Khomeini and Kemal Atatürk's Iran and Turkey?)
Mazhabi Wa Siyasi Bavay (Religious and Political Leaders)
Rawayyee Meray Hazoor Kay (My Prophet's Behaviour)
Seerat Kay Suchay Moti (Real Pearls of the Prophet's Character)

References 

1959 births
Living people
Lashkar-e-Taiba members
Mujahideen members of the Soviet–Afghan War
Leaders of Islamic terror groups
Pakistani Islamists
People from Sheikhupura